22 More Hits is George Strait's 2007 compilation CD, comprising hits that did not reach Number One (except for "She Let Herself Go") on the country charts, from his 1981 debut single "Unwound" to his most recent single at the time of the album's release, "How 'bout Them Cowgirls". The collection is intended as a follow up companion to 50 Number Ones, a 2004 compilation which featured all of Strait's singles that had reached #1 to that point.

Track listing

Chart performance 
The album debuted at number 13 on the U.S. Billboard 200 chart, selling about 80,000 copies in its first week.

Weekly charts

Year-end charts

Certifications

References 

2007 greatest hits albums
George Strait compilation albums
MCA Records compilation albums